Helton is a forename and a surname of Old English origin. It is derived from the family that lived in the village of Elton in Cheshire, England.  The village's motto is Artibus et armis. It is also the name of a village in Cumbria, England. Variants of the name include:
Eltone, Elton, and Ellton.  People with the Helton surname or given name include:

Surname

 Barry and Sally Childs-Helton, American, filk writers and singers
 Arthur Helton (1949–2003) American, lawyer, refugee advocate, teacher and author who died in the Canal Hotel Bombing in Baghdad
 Barry Helton (born 1965), American football player
 Clay Helton (born 1972), American football coach
 Derrick Helton (born 1985), American Paralympic wheelchair rugby player
 Jo Helton (1933-2021), American actress and social worker
 Johann Helton (born 1953), American folk musician
 John Helton (born 1946), Canadian football player
 Kim Helton (born 1948), American, football offensive coordinator for the University of Alabama at Birmingham
 Kyle Helton (born 1986), American soccer player
 Mike Helton (born c. 1953), American, president of NASCAR
 Percy Helton (1894–1971), American actor
 R. J. Helton (born 1981), American singer
 Roy Helton (1886-1977), American poet
 Todd Helton (born 1973), American baseball player

Given name

 Helton Samo Cunha (born 1980), Mozambican soccer player
 Helton Arruda (born 1978), Brazilian football (soccer) player
 Helton Dos Reis (born 1988), French footballer
 Helton Godwin Baynes (1882-1943), English analytical psychologist and author
 Helton Soares (born 1974), Brazilian footballer

See also
List of Old English (Anglo-Saxon) surnames
Elton (name), a similar name

English given names
Masculine given names